Kendrick Wayne Williamson (born January 27, 1938) is a former American football player and coach. He served as the head football coach at Parsons College from 1968 to 1969, compiling a record of 7–12.

References

External links
 Florida Sports Hall of Fame profile
 Sports-Reference career statistics

1938 births
Living people
American football quarterbacks
Florida Gators football players
Parsons Wildcats athletic directors
Parsons Wildcats football coaches
People from Luverne, Alabama
Players of American football from Alabama